St Leonard's Church is a former parish church building located in Perth, Perth and Kinross, Scotland. Standing on King Street, at the head of Charterhouse Lane, it was completed in 1836. It is now a Category B listed building. The church was designed by local architect William Macdonald Mackenzie.

James Smart made additions to the building in 1891, including the apse to the west which includes colourful high Victorian stained glass.

See also

List of listed buildings in Perth, Scotland

References 

Category B listed buildings in Perth and Kinross
Listed churches in Scotland
Leonard's Parish
1836 establishments in Scotland
Listed buildings in Perth, Scotland